Statistics of Primera Fuerza in season 1922-23.

Overview
It was contested by 8 teams, and Asturias won the championship.

League standings
(All clubs from México City)

References
Mexico - List of final tables (RSSSF)

1922-23
Mex
1922–23 in Mexican football